Pycnopygius is a genus of bird in the Meliphagidae, or honeyeater, family. Established by Tommaso Salvadori in 1880, it contains the following species:
 Marbled honeyeater (Pycnopygius cinereus)
 Plain honeyeater (Pycnopygius ixoides)
 Streak-headed honeyeater (Pycnopygius stictocephalus)

The name Pycnopygius is a combination of the Greek words puknos, meaning "thick" or "dense" and  -pugios, meaning "-rumped" (from pugẽ: "rump").

References

 
Bird genera
 
Taxonomy articles created by Polbot